Mäeküla is a village in Põhja-Sakala Parish, Viljandi County in central Estonia. It has a population of 52 (as of 2009).

References

Villages in Viljandi County